In celestial mechanics, true anomaly is an angular parameter that defines the position of a body moving along a Keplerian orbit.  It is the angle between the direction of periapsis and the current position of the body, as seen from the main focus of the ellipse (the point around which the object orbits).

As shown in the image , the true anomaly  is one of three angular parameters (anomalies) that defines a position along an orbit, the other two being the eccentric anomaly and the mean anomaly.

Formulas

From state vectors
For elliptic orbits, the true anomaly  can be calculated from orbital state vectors as:

(if  then replace  by )

where: 
 v is the orbital velocity vector of the orbiting body,
 e is the eccentricity vector,
 r is the orbital position vector (segment FP in the figure) of the orbiting body.

Circular orbit
For circular orbits the true anomaly is undefined, because circular orbits do not have a uniquely determined periapsis. Instead the argument of latitude u is used:

(if  then replace )

where:
 n is a vector pointing towards the ascending node (i.e. the z-component of n is zero).
 rz is the z-component of the orbital position vector r

Circular orbit with zero inclination
For circular orbits with zero inclination the argument of latitude is also undefined, because there is no uniquely determined line of nodes. One uses the true longitude instead:

(if  then replace  by )

where:
 rx is the x-component of the orbital position vector r
 vx is the x-component of the orbital velocity vector v.

From the eccentric anomaly
The relation between the true anomaly  and the eccentric anomaly  is:

or using the sine and tangent:

or equivalently:

so

Alternatively, a form of this equation was derived by  that avoids numerical issues when the arguments are near , as the two tangents become infinite.

 where 

so

From the mean anomaly
The true anomaly can be calculated directly from the mean anomaly  via a Fourier expansion:

with Bessel functions  and parameter .

Omitting all terms of order  or higher (indicated by ), it can be written as

Note that for reasons of accuracy this approximation is usually limited to orbits where the eccentricity  is small.

The expression  is known as the equation of the center, where more details about the expansion are given.

Radius from true anomaly
The radius (distance between the focus of attraction and the orbiting body) is related to the true anomaly by the formula

where a is the orbit's semi-major axis.

See also
 Kepler's laws of planetary motion
 Eccentric anomaly
 Mean anomaly
 Ellipse
 Hyperbola

References

Further reading
 Murray, C. D. & Dermott, S. F., 1999, Solar System Dynamics, Cambridge University Press, Cambridge. 
 Plummer, H. C., 1960, An Introductory Treatise on Dynamical Astronomy, Dover Publications, New York.  (Reprint of the 1918 Cambridge University Press edition.)

External links 

 Federal Aviation Administration - Describing Orbits

Orbits